The Australian Space Council was an advisory body formed to replace the Australian Space Board by the Australian Space Council Act of 1994. It was part of Australia's National Space Program, along with the Australian Space Office and various other non-governmental bodies.

As defined in the act, the council's functions were to:

 Report to the minister matters affecting the application of space related science and technology,
 To recommend the minister on matters of the National Space Program, and
 To co-ordinate the involvement of the public and private sectors in the program

The council was abolished in 1996 by the Howard Government after a review by the Bureau of Industry Economics.

See also

 National Space Program

References 

Space programme of Australia
1994 establishments in Australia
Government agencies established in 1994
Defunct Commonwealth Government agencies of Australia
1996 disestablishments in Australia